Dāvids Kalandija (born 1993), is a Latvian singer and former judo and MMA fighter in the Latvian national team.

Career
His singing career started when he reportedly broke his neck after an incident.

On 1 December 2011, Kalandija was announced as one of the singers for Eirodziesma 2012, performing the song "I Want You Back" alongside Samanta Tīna. The duo advanced from semi-final on 7 January 2012 up to the finals.

On July 19, 2019, he was one of the performers for the Jurmala Day 2019.

Driving without a license 
In 2013, he was faced with criticism when he was allegedly caught driving without license.

References

1993 births
Living people
Sportspeople from Riga
21st-century Latvian male singers
Latvian pop singers
English-language singers from Latvia
Musicians from Riga